Glasgow Tigers may refer to:

Glasgow Tigers (American football), an American football team competing in the BAFA National Leagues
Glasgow Tigers (speedway), a motorcycle speedway team competing in the Speedway Premier League